Felice Soldini (26 October 1915 – 15 January 1971) was a Swiss football defender who played for Switzerland in the 1950 FIFA World Cup. He also played for AC Bellinzona.

References

External links
 
 

1915 births
1971 deaths
Swiss men's footballers
Switzerland international footballers
Association football defenders
AC Bellinzona players
1950 FIFA World Cup players